L'Isle-aux-Coudres is a municipality in Quebec, Canada, in the Charlevoix Regional County Municipality in the Charlevoix area of the Capitale-Nationale region.

The island was named by Jacques Cartier during his second expedition in 1535 for the many nut-bearing trees on the island. "Coudriers" is the archaic French word for Hazel tree. Whereas the modern French spelling for "island" is île, the municipality uses the old French spelling of Isle.

Its population centres include La Baleine in the north-east, (Saint-Louis-de-)l'Isle-aux-Coudres in the south, and Saint-Bernard-sur-Mer in the north-west facing Baie-Saint-Paul. A free ferry service connects Saint-Bernard-sur-Mer to Saint-Joseph-de-la-Rive on the north shore of the gulf.

Formerly, porpoise fishing was practised on a broad basis, supplemented by some boat construction. Today tourism is the main industry, and the place is known for its historical sites, tourist accommodations, and craftspeople. On the beach near the ferry dock, there is a shipyard that is home to craftsmen who work according to ancestral techniques. The island is also a popular destination for cyclists.

It was the setting for the classic 1963 National Film Board of Canada documentary Pour la suite du monde.

Geography
It is thought to have been formed from material lifted up by the impact of the meteor which formed the Charlevoix region. Local streams include the Rouge River and Mare Creek.

History
Étienne de Lessart of Ste. Anne-de-Beaupré was granted title as the first Seigneur of l'Isle-aux-Coudres by Governor Buade de Frontenac on March 4, 1677. Due to a failure to develop the property to increase its value he was forced to sell the seigneurie on October 19, 1687 to the Séminaire de Québec who began to establish a monastery on the site.

On October 29, 1687, Governor Denonville and Intendant Champigny granted the island as a seignory to the Seminary of Quebec, an act that was ratified on March 1, 1688.

In 1728, the first concessions of land were granted to settlers, and by 1741, the Parish of Saint-Louis-de-France was formed, soon after renamed to Saint-Louis-de-l'Isle-aux-Coudres. Named after Louis IX of France, it probably was also a tribute to Louis Chaumont (or Chaumonot) de La Jaunière (ca. 1700-1776), priest of Baie-Saint-Paul from 1736 to 1767. In 1845, the Parish Municipality of Saint-Louis-de-l'Isle-aux-Coudres was formed. In 1847, it was abolished, but reestablished in 1855, and would remain the only municipality covering the entire island for the next 80 years.

The community of Saint-Bernard-sur-Mer, first known as Pointe-des-Roches until 1936, only really developed from 1902 onward. The Parish of Saint-Bernard, named in honour of Bernard of Clairvaux (ca. 1090-1153), was officially founded in 1934 when it separated from the Parish of Saint-Louis, and was incorporated as the Municipality of Saint-Bernard-de-l'Île-aux-Coudres in 1936.

In 1951, the Municipality of La Baleine was incorporated, when it separated from Saint-Louis-de-l'Isle-aux-Coudres. It was named after an incident that had occurred in the late 18th century when the islanders found a carcass of a dead whale (in French: baleine) that had stranded on the island's flats. At this point, the island was divided into three municipal entities.

On January 5, 1994, the Municipality of Saint-Bernard-de-l'Île-aux-Coudres and the Parish Municipality of Saint-Louis-de-l'Isle-aux-Coudres were merged and formed the Municipality of L'Île-aux-Coudres (new spelling). On August 23, 2000, this municipality and the Municipality of La Baleine were merged again to form the new Municipality of L'Isle-aux-Coudres (old spelling).

Demographics
Population trend:
 Population in 2016: 1143 (2011 to 2016 population change: -10.6%)
 Population in 2011: 1279 (2006 to 2011 population change: -1.3%)
 Population in 2006: 1296
 Population in 2001: 1319
 Population in 1996:
 L'Ile-aux-Coudres (municipality): 1066
 La Baleine (municipality): 279
 Population in 1991:
 L'Ile-aux-Coudres (municipality): 1101
 La Baleine (municipality): 282

Private dwellings occupied by usual residents: 551 (total dwellings: 754)

Mother tongue:

 French as first language: 98.3%
 English as first language: 0.9%
 English and French as first language: 0.4%
 Other as first language: 0.9%

See also 
 Société des traversiers du Québec

References

External links
Les Moulins de L'Isle-aux-Coudres

Municipalities in Quebec
Incorporated places in Capitale-Nationale
1728 establishments in the French colonial empire